Lidan Paishi Pian is a sugar-coated tablet or film-coated tablet with a brown core, used in Traditional Chinese medicine to "remove damp-heat, increase the flow of bile and expel calculi". It tastes bitter and salty.

It is used when there are symptoms of "cholelithiasis, infection of the biliary tract, and cholecystitis".

A traditional Chinese doctor typically prescribes about 6 to 10 tablets for expelling calculi, and about 4 to 6 tablets for treating inflammation, twice a day.

Chinese classic herbal formula

See also
 Chinese classic herbal formula
 Bu Zhong Yi Qi Wan

References

Traditional Chinese medicine pills